Mâlain is a commune in the Côte-d'Or department in eastern France.

Population

Sights
 The Château Fort Saint-Georges, or Château Fort de Mâlain, is a ruined castle with origins from the 11th century.

See also
Communes of the Côte-d'Or department

References

Communes of Côte-d'Or